Thirty One Backyards is a 1965 television play directed and produced by Raymond Menmuir and starring Ray Barrett. It was written by Alan Seymour.

The play was by an Australian writer and done with Australian cast and director but was made in London. It was one of four plays by Australian writers bought for Australian television. It was made by Rediffusion.

Plot
A young Australian writer, Larry, works out his affair with a spirited English girl, Delphine. They meet at a party.

Cast
Ray Barrett as Larry
Susan Hampshire as Delphine
Jack Smethurst

Reception
The Tribune said "The play, a competent and entertaining observation on some aspects of the British character and way of life, took an amusing stab at exploding the myth that all Australian men are tall, bronzed gods. The production and direction were very good indeed."

See also
List of television plays broadcast on Australian Broadcasting Corporation (1960s)

References

1965 television plays
1960s Australian television plays